Pragya Jaiswal is an Indian actress and model who predominantly works in Telugu films. She made her acting debut in 2014 with the Tamil–Telugu bilingual Virattu / Dega in 2014. Jaiswal had her breakthrough with the Telugu period drama Kanche (2015), for which she was awarded the Filmfare Award for Best Female Debut – South.

Jaiswal made her Hindi film debut with Titoo MBA. She has also appeared in films including Nakshatram (2017) and Achari America Yatra (2018). In 2021, she played the role of an IAS Officer in the successful film Akhanda.

Early life 
Pragya Jaiswal completed her education from Symbiosis Law School at Pune.

During her initial days at the Symbiosis University, she participated in various beauty pageants and became a successful model. In 2014, she received the Symbiosis Sanskritik Puraskar for her achievement in the field of art and culture.

Career 
Jaiswal made her acting debut in the Indian Tamil and Telugu bilingual film named Virattu / Dega, released in 2014. In 2015, she starred in the Telugu film Mirchi Lanti Kurradu and later in the period drama Kanche directed by Krish. Jaiswal had previously auditioned for a role in Krish's Gabbar Is Back. She did not land that role but Krish later offered her the role in Kanche.  She played a cameo in Jaya Janaki Nayaka starring Bellamkonda Sreenivas, Rakul Preet Singh and Jagapathi Babu.

She made a cameo appearance for the song "Anandam" in the devotional Biographical film of Hathiram Bhavaji, directed by K. Raghavendra Rao for Nagarjuna's Om Namo Venkatesaya in 2017. Akhanda was her recent movie as a main female lead opposite to Nandamuri Balakrishna which has collected around 133 Crores gross Worldwide.

Filmography

Films

 All films are in Telugu unless otherwise noted

Music video

Awards and nominations

References

External links 

 

21st-century Indian actresses
Actresses from Madhya Pradesh
Actresses in Hindi cinema
Actresses in Telugu cinema
Female models from Madhya Pradesh
Indian film actresses
Living people
People from Jabalpur
South Indian International Movie Awards winners
Filmfare Awards South winners
1991 births